The women's 200 metres event at the 2007 European Athletics U23 Championships was held in Debrecen, Hungary, at Gyulai István Atlétikai Stadion on 13 and 14 July.

Medalists

Results

Final
14 July
Wind: -1.1 m/s

Semifinals
14 July
Qualified: first 4 in each heat to the Final

Semifinal 1
Wind: -0.6 m/s

Semifinal 2
Wind: -0.2 m/s

Heats
13 July
Qualified: first 3 in each heat and 4 best to the Semifinal

Heat 1
Wind: 0.3 m/s

Heat 2
Wind: 0.1 m/s

Heat 3
Wind: 0.1 m/s

Heat 4
Wind: 0.1 m/s

Participation
According to an unofficial count, 32 athletes from 20 countries participated in the event.

 (1)
 (1)
 (1)
 (1)
 (1)
 (3)
 (2)
 (2)
 (1)
 (1)
 (1)
 (2)
 (1)
 (1)
 (2)
 (3)
 (2)
 (1)
 (3)
 (2)

References

200 metres
200 metres at the European Athletics U23 Championships